Bhamori is a village in Punasa tehsil of Khandwa district in Madhya Pradesh, India. As of the 2011 census, the total population is 740.

References 

Villages in Khandwa district